Valerie Tiberius is Professor of Philosophy at the University of Minnesota, an institution she has been affiliated with since 1998. She has published numerous reviewed papers, as well as five books - Deliberation about the Good: Justifying What We Value; The Reflective Life: Living Wisely With Our Limits; Moral Psychology: A Contemporary Introduction; Well-Being as Value Fulfillment: How We Can Help Each Other to Live Well; and What Do You Want Out of Life? A Philosophical Guide to Figuring Out What Matters. Much of her work has taken a practical, empirical approach to philosophical questions, trying to show how these disciplines can improve the world for the better.

Education and career
Tiberius received a bachelor's degree in philosophy from the University of Toronto in 1990, before going on to receive a master's and doctorate in philosophy from the University of North Carolina at Chapel Hill in 1992 and 1997, respectively. Her doctoral thesis was titled Deliberation About the Good, which later became the basis for her first book.  After receiving her doctorate, Tiberius accepted a position as assistant professor at Franklin and Marshall College, before accepting an assistant professorship at the University of Minnesota, Twin Cities in 1998.  She was promoted to associate professor in 2004, and to full professor in 2011.

Research areas
Tiberius's work has focused on ethics and moral psychology, with a special interest in applying Humean principles to modern philosophical questions.  Much of her work is centered at the junction of practical philosophy and practical psychology, examining how both disciplines can meaningfully improve lives. Much of her work takes a non-traditional empirical approach to traditional philosophical questions.

Publications
Tiberius has published a number of peer-reviewed papers, as well as five books - Deliberation about the Good: Justifying What We Value; The Reflective Life: Living Wisely with our Limits;  Moral Psychology: A Contemporary Introduction; Well-Being as Value Fulfillment: How We Can Help Each Other to Live Well; and What Do You Want Out of Life? A Philosophical Guide to Figuring Out What Matters.  She has also contributed numerous other book chapters, introductions, and other articles.

The Reflective Life: Living Wisely with our Limits
Tiberius's second book, The Reflective Life: Living Wisely With Our Limits, attempts to bridge the gap between theoretical philosophy and day-to-day life, providing an explanation for why anyone should care about issues of ethical inquiry. She does so by bringing a Humean approach to the ideas of reflective values and reflective virtues. The viewpoint Tiberius presents represents a novel synthesis of ancient philosophy with modern phenomenology and cognitive psychology.  Tiberius's volume is one of the first attempts - ever - to deal with the implications of introspection illusion, the adaptive unconscious, affective forecasting, and their implications for modern ethical theory.

References

American women philosophers
University of Minnesota faculty
University of North Carolina at Chapel Hill alumni